Hans Ackermann (16th century) was a German dramatist, living in Zwickau. He was a close friend of Paul Rebhun, another contemporary dramatist.

Publications

 Der Verlorene Sohn, 1536
 Tobias, praising marriage as opposed to the celibacy promoted by the catholic church.

Sources

 Allgemeine Deutsche Biographie - online version at Wikisource

Year of birth unknown
Year of death unknown
16th-century German writers
16th-century German male writers
German male dramatists and playwrights
16th-century dramatists and playwrights